Kahang is a mukim in Kluang District, Johor, Malaysia. It is particularly known as the final stop before heading to the Endau Rompin National Park and located along the Malaysia Federal Route 50.

Geography
The mukim spans over an area of 548 km2.

Economy
Kahang has an organic paddy farm 28 miles away from Kluang.

School in Kahang

Primary school
 Sekolah Kebangsaan Seri Sedohok
 Sekolah Kebangsaan Ladang Mutiara
 Sekolah Kebangsaan Kahang
 Sekolah Jenis Kebangsaan (Tamil) Kahang Batu 24
 Sekolah Jenis Kebangsaan (Cina) Kahang

Secondary school
 Sekolah Menengah Kebangsaan Kahang

References

Mukims of Kluang District